Seppeltsfield is a locality in South Australia  on the western side of the Barossa Valley. It is also the location of the historic Seppeltsfield winery. At the 2016 Australian census, Seppeltsfield had a population of 138.

Seppeltsfield was established in 1852 when Joseph Ernst Seppelt bought land and moved there after having migrated from Lower Silesia to South Australia in 1849. He attempted to grow tobacco, then grew corn, wheat and grapes.

References

Towns in South Australia